The 1927 New York Giants season was the franchise's 45th season.  The team finished third in the National League with a record of 92–62, 2 games behind the Pittsburgh Pirates.

Offseason 
During the offseason, the Giants acquired Rogers Hornsby from the St. Louis Cardinals for Frankie Frisch and Jimmy Ring. Hornsby's offensive numbers rebounded in 1927, as he hit .361 and led the league in runs scored (133), walks (86), and an on-base percentage (.448). The deal was held up because Hornsby, as part of his contract as the manager of the Cardinals (he was a player-manager at the time), owned several shares of stock in the Cardinals. Cardinals owner Sam Breadon offered Hornsby a sum for the stock considerably lower than what Hornsby demanded for it, and neither would budge. Eventually, the other owners of the National League made up the difference, and the trade went through.

Notable transactions 
 December 20, 1926: Frankie Frisch and Jimmy Ring were traded by the Giants to the St. Louis Cardinals for Rogers Hornsby.

Regular season

Season standings

Record vs. opponents

Notable transactions 
 May 9, 1927: Don Songer was purchased by the Giants from the Pittsburgh Pirates.

Roster

Player stats

Batting

Starters by position 
Note: Pos = Position; G = Games played; AB = At bats; H = Hits; Avg. = Batting average; HR = Home runs; RBI = Runs batted in

Other batters 
Note: G = Games played; AB = At bats; H = Hits; Avg. = Batting average; HR = Home runs; RBI = Runs batted in

Pitching

Starting pitchers 
Note: G = Games pitched; IP = Innings pitched; W = Wins; L = Losses; ERA = Earned run average; SO = Strikeouts

Other pitchers 
Note: G = Games pitched; IP = Innings pitched; W = Wins; L = Losses; ERA = Earned run average; SO = Strikeouts

Relief pitchers 
Note: G = Games pitched; W = Wins; L = Losses; SV = Saves; ERA = Earned run average; SO = Strikeouts

Notes

References 
1927 New York Giants season at Baseball Reference

New York Giants (NL)
San Francisco Giants seasons
New York Giants season
New York
1920s in Manhattan
Washington Heights, Manhattan